John Louis Leary (May 2, 1891 – August 18, 1961) was a Major League Baseball first baseman and catcher who played with the St. Louis Browns in  and .

External links

1891 births
1961 deaths
Major League Baseball first basemen
Major League Baseball catchers
Baseball players from Massachusetts
St. Louis Browns players
Savannah Indians players
Jacksonville Tarpons players
Utica Utes players
Indianapolis Indians players